Snake lily is a common name for several plants and may refer to:
 Amorphophallus, a large genus
 Konjac, a common name of the Asian plant Amorphophallus konjac
 Dichelostemma multiflorum, native to California and Oregon
 Dracunculus vulgaris, endemic to the Balkans
 Scadoxus puniceus, native to much of southern and eastern Africa